Vitreology is a historic reference to a subspecialised field of ophthalmology and vision science that deals exclusively with the health and disease of the vitreous body within the eye. References to the term vitreology have become less common since the 1970s.

References 

Ophthalmology
Vision